is a Japanese communist activist and founder of the disbanded militant group Japanese Red Army (JRA).

Early life
Shigenobu was born on 28 September 1945 in the Setagaya ward of Tokyo. Her father served as a major in the Imperial Japanese Army and was dispatched to Manchukuo.

After high school, Shigenobu went to work for the Kikkoman corporation and took night courses at Meiji University. She eventually received a Bachelor of Arts in Political Economy and in History. She joined the student movement that was protesting the increase of tuition fees. In 1966, she joined the New Left group the Communist League, better known as the "Second Bund," and in 1969 she became a leading member of the group's "Red Army" splinter faction, which would eventually evolve into a separate group called the Japanese Red Army.

JRA movement
In February 1971, she and Tsuyoshi Okudaira went to the Middle East to create international branches of the Red Army Faction. Upon arrival, she soon split with the Red Army Faction in Japan due to both geographical and ideological distance, as well as a personal conflict with the new leader, Tsuneo Mori. The Red Army went on to link up with the Maoist Revolutionary Left Wing of the Japanese Communist Party to form the United Red Army. Upon hearing about the internal purge the United Red Army carried out in the winter of 1971–1972, Shigenobu recalls her shock and sorrow. She and Okudaira wrote My Love, My Revolution (わが愛わが革命) as a response, the title of which was a reference to Mitsuko Tokoro's influential essay collection My Love and Rebellion.

Shigenobu remained in the Middle East for more than 30 years. Her move reflected the concept of "international revolutionary solidarity," with the idea that revolutionary movements should cooperate and eventually lead to a global socialist revolution. Her destination was Lebanon, and her aim was to support the Palestinian cause. She originally joined the Popular Front for the Liberation of Palestine (PFLP) as a volunteer, but eventually the JRA became an independent group. She mentions in several of her books that "the mission's purpose was to consolidate the international revolutionary alliance against the imperialists of the world."

In 1972, three members of the JRA carried out the Lod Airport massacre at Lod Airport in Israel at Shigenobu's instigation.

On 1 March 1973 in Beirut, Lebanon, Fusako Shigenobu gave birth to her first and only daughter, Mei Shigenobu. The identity of the father remains a secret to the public with it being reported that he was a militant for the Popular Front for the Liberation of Palestine. Fusako Shigenobu has since written a book about her relationship with her daughter.

Shigenobu was listed as a wanted person by the INTERPOL in 1974 after the French embassy hostage-taking in the Hague in which she was involved.

Arrest
Since 1991, Shigenobu had established the "People's Revolutionary Party" for the purpose of "armed revolution" in Japan with the front organization "The 21st Century of Hope" in charge of its public activities. It is also said that she used it as a foothold to plan cooperation with the Japanese Socialist Party. After that, she went into hiding in an apartment in Nishinari Ward, Osaka for a while.

In 2000, Osaka Prefectural Police Public Safety Section 3 was investigating supporters of the Japanese Red Army and began to investigate a person who was in contact with a person who looked similar in appearance to Shigenobu.

Shigenobu was characterized by a birthmark on her face, but she hid her birthmark with makeup. However, her mannerism when smoking was similar to that of Shigenobu and she would often drink coffee at the same place. Fingerprints were collected from a coffee cup that she frequented and used to identify her as Shigenobu.

Shigenobu was arrested on 8 November 2000, outside a hotel in Takatsuki, Osaka Prefecture, after entering Japan illegally through Kansai International Airport using a forged passport that she obtained by impersonating another person some time between 1997 and 2000. Shigenobu was using the alias, "Fusako Okudaira," with which the arresting officers greeted her in order to gain her attention when they approached her. The same day she was transported to Tokyo to be interrogated by the Metropolitan Police Department although it was reported that she refused to answer any of her interrogators' questions. When Shigenobu spotted the waiting cameras, she raised her hands and gave the thumbs-up, shouting at reporters: "I'll fight on!"

Trial 
After a lengthy trial, Shigenobu was sentenced to 20 years in prison on 8 March 2006.

The prosecution charged her on three counts, the use of forged passport, aiding another member in the JRA in obtaining a forged passport, and attempted manslaughter by planning and commanding the 1974 occupation and hostage taking at the French embassy in The Hague, the Netherlands. Shigenobu pleaded guilty to the first two charges, but not guilty to the charge linking her to the 1974 embassy hostage taking. Among the witnesses that appeared in her court for the defense was Leila Khaled, known for the 1969 hijacking of TWA Flight 840, and currently a member of the Palestinian National Council.

Prosecutors argued that the Japanese Red Army issued a statement the day after the Hague attack and asked the Palestinian Liberation People's Front (PFLP) in other Japanese Red Army publications to coordinate with them. Based on the testimonies of former JRA members, who testified that Shigenobu had scolded them for lack of preparation at a meeting after the incident, and accused her of masterminding the attack, prosecutors sought a sentence of life imprisonment.

In response to this, the defense argued, "At the time of the French embassy hostage-taking, the Japanese Red Army did not have an organizational structure and was not in a position to be given orders by Shigenobu because it was a PFLP operation and she was in Libya at the time and thus had an alibi."

In his final verdict, Judge Hironobu Murakami of Tokyo District Court found on 23 February 2006 that Shigenobu "played an important role in asking cooperating organizations to procure weapons and coordinate with countries that accept released compatriots." However, Murakami stated that there was no conclusive evidence of her involvement in the armed occupation of the embassy that resulted in the injury of two policemen, or in the intention of attempted manslaughter. Therefore the judge ruled that "a sentence of life imprisonment is too heavy," because while Shigenobu was a leader she did not control the entire organization. However, the judge did find Shigenobu guilty of the lesser charge of conspiring with others to attack the embassy, and sentenced her to 20 years in prison on 8 March 2006.

Appeals and imprisonment
Shigenobu's daughter Mei Shigenobu and chief attorney Kyoko Otani filed an appeal on the same day as Shigenobu's sentencing.

On 20 December 2007, the Tokyo High Court upheld the lower court's decision and dismissed the appeal.

Shigenobu filed another appeal, but on 15 July 2010, the decision was made to reject it and the sentence was confirmed.

Shigenobu filed an objection to the decision to reject the appeal, but on 4 August 2010, the Supreme Court of Japan's No. 2 Small Court (Yukio Takeuchi, Chief Justice presiding) reject the Shigenobu's final appeal, and the sentence of 20 years in prison was finalized.

However, as Shigenobu had already served 810 days in prison, her sentence was reduced by time served to 17 years and Shigenobu's release was planned for 2022.

Life in prison 
In 2001, Shigenobu formally announced the dissolution of the Red Army from her prison cell and proclaimed the armed struggle over. She declared,

At a press conference before her sentencing in February 2006, her lawyers read out a haiku she had composed, reading:

In December 2008, Shigenobu was diagnosed with both colon cancer and intestinal cancer and has had three operations to remove them. As of 2014 Shigenobu was detained in Hachioji Medical Prison where she was recovering from her medical procedures.

In June 2009, in an extremely rare interview with the Sankei Shimbun, Shigenobu said of her past activities, "We were just university students. We thought we knew everything. We thought we were going to change the world. We didn't realize that in fact we were just causing trouble for everyone."

Shigenobu added,

We only resorted to armed struggle because the movement had stalled. Although similar student movements were taking place all around the world, not all of them resorted to armed struggle. Some people went back to their home towns and continued the movement at the local level. People have friends and family in their home towns, people who can help them out and restrain them if they start to go too far. If we had gone back to our home towns and continued the movement there, we might have gotten different results.

Release
On 28 May 2022, Shigenobu was released from prison in Tokyo, met by a small crowd of supporters and a banner reading, "We love Fusako". Shigenobu commented that she will be focusing on her cancer treatment, explaining she will not be able to "contribute to society" given her condition, stating that she will continue to reflect on her past and "live more and more with curiosity." The Tokyo Metropolitan Police said that she will be placed under surveillance after her release.

In popular culture

 Eileen MacDonald's 1991 book Shoot the Women First mistakenly conflates Shigenobu with Hiroko Nagata, attributing to her the actions of Nagata at the United Red Army purge of 1971–1972.
PANTA, Japanese rock singer and longtime friend of Shigenobu, released his album Oriibu no Ki no shitade in 2007. Shigenobu wrote some of the lyrics.
 The actress Anri Ban portrayed her in the Kōji Wakamatsu film United Red Army (2007).
 In 2008, artist Anicka Yi and architect Maggie Peng created a perfume dedicated to Shigenobu, called Shigenobu Twilight.
 In 2010, Shigenobu and her daughter Mei were featured in the documentary Children of the Revolution, which premiered at the International Documentary Festival Amsterdam.

Publications
 1974:　My Love, My Revolution『わが愛わが革命』 Kodansha.
 1983: 『十年目の眼差から』 話の特集、
 1984: If You Put Your Ear to the Earth, You Can Hear the Sound of Japan: Lessons from The Japanese Communist Movement 『大地に耳をつければ日本の音がする　日本共産主義運動の教訓』ウニタ書舗、
 1984: Beirut, Summer 1982 『ベイルート1982年夏』話の特集、
 1985: Materials: Reports from the Middle East 1 『資料・中東レポート』1（日本赤軍との共編著）、ウニタ書舗、
 1986: Materials: Reports from the Middle East 2 『資料・中東レポート』2（日本赤軍との共編著）、ウニタ書舗、
 2001: I Decided to Give Birth to You Under an Apple Tree 『りんごの木の下であなたを産もうと決めた』幻冬舎、
 2005: Jasmine in the Muzzle of a Gun: Collected Poems of Shigenobu Fusako 『ジャスミンを銃口に　重信房子歌集』幻冬舎、
 2009: A Personal History of the Japanese Red Army: Together with Palestine 『日本赤軍私史　パレスチナと共に』河出書房新社、
 2012: Season of the Revolution: From the Battlefield in Palestine 『革命の季節 パレスチナの戦場から』幻冬舎、

See also 

 Japanese Red Army
 Red Army Faction (Japan)
 Anti-Japaneseism
 East Asia Anti-Japan Armed Front
 Japan Revolutionary Communist League (Revolutionary Marxist Faction)
 Revolutionary Communist League, National Committee
 Zengakuren

References

Living people
1945 births
Japanese communists
Japan–State of Palestine relations
Meiji University alumni
People convicted of forgery
People from Setagaya
Japanese Red Army